Monstera maderaverde is a species of flowering plant in the genus Monstera in the arum family, Araceae. Its native range is Honduras.

References 

maderaverde